The Mystery of Compassion is an album by American jazz French horn player and composer Tom Varner recorded in 1992 and released on the Italian Soul Note label.

Reception

The AllMusic review by Brian Olewnick awarded the album 4 stars stating "Varner's ensemble offers up fascinating music that straddles the borders between jazz and an urban mix with a root or two in noir soundtracks, world music, and who knows what else. The Mystery of Compassion is a must for fans of the jazzier edges of the downtown New York scene".

The authors of the Penguin Guide to Jazz Recordings awarded the album 4 stars, and wrote: "Varner's alarming juxtapositions make coherent sense without losing their capacity to surprise, and the players involved respond with a passionate intensity which is rare even among these driven musicians."

Track listing
All compositions and arrangements by Tom Varner
 "How Does Power Work?" - 9:32 
 "Water and Wood" - 5:56 
 "Fool's Oasis" - 8:26 
 "A Severed Arm" - 1:01 
 "The Well" - 13:52 
 "Death at the Right Time" - 7:21 
 "Control Passion" - 9:53 
 "Plunge" - 0:53 
 "$1000 Hat" - 14:15 
 "Prayer" - 3:20
Recorded at Baby Monster Studio in New York City on March 5, 6 & 7, 1992

Personnel
Tom Varner - French horn
Matt Darriau (track 6), Ed Jackson (tracks 1-5 & 7-9) - alto saxophone
Ellery Eskelin (track 6), Rich Rothenberg (tracks 1-9) - tenor saxophone 
Jim Hartog - baritone saxophone (track 6)
Steve Swell - trombone (tracks 6 & 10)
Dave Taylor - bass trombone (tracks 6 & 10) 
Mark Feldman - violin (track 5)
Mike Richmond - bass (tracks 1-9)
Tom Rainey - drums (tracks 1-9)

References

Black Saint/Soul Note albums
Tom Varner albums
1992 albums